The speed of sound is a physical characteristic.

Speed of sound may also refer to:
 "Speed of Sound" (song), by Coldplay, 2005
 The Speed of Sound (EP), by In Stereo, 2016
 "Speed of Sound", a song from the Pearl Jam album Backspacer
 "Speed of Sound", a song from the Communist Daughter album "Soundtrack to the End"
 Speed of Sound (Anvil album), by Canadian heavy metal band Anvil
Speed of Sound (Nick Phoenix album), 2013 album by Nick Phoenix
 The Speed of Sound (album), by American rock guitarist Ronnie Montrose
 Speed of Sound (roller coaster), a rollercoaster at Walibi Holland themepark in The Netherlands
 Wings at the Speed of Sound, a 1976 studio album by Paul McCartney and Wings

See also
 Velocity of Sound, a 2002 album by The Apples in Stereo
 "Velocity of Sound", a 2001 song by  MOMO on the I've album Out Flow